Matthew Stephen Phillip Neal (born 20 December 1966) is a British motor racing driver. Neal is a triple BTCC Champion having won the British Touring Car Championship in 2005, 2006 and 2011. Neal is also a record 6 time BTCC Independents Champion having won the title in 1993, 1995, 1999, 2000, 2005 and 2006. He is also a race winner in the European Touring Car Championship. He is 6' 6" (2 m) tall, making him almost entirely unable to race single-seaters. He is also the Group Marketing Director at Rimstock, the alloy wheel manufacturer founded by his father Steve.

Career

Early years
Born in Stourbridge, Neal started out in Motocross but moved into cars in 1988, driving in the Ford Fiesta XR2i category. He was the British Group N Champion in 1990 and 1991. He also co-drove a BMW M3 to victory at the 1990 Willhire 24 Hour race at Snetterton.

British Touring Car Championship (1991–2001)

Neal made his BTCC debut with Pyramid Motorsport at the Silverstone round of the 1991 BTCC season driving a BMW M3. He finished 13th in his first race before returning to the series two rounds later at Oulton Park with the Auto Trader Techspeed Team in another BMW M3. After that race he would race for the team two rounds later at Donington Park. For 1992 he joined his father's Team Dynamics team driving the BMW M3 which Will Hoy had taken to the championship title the year before. The car was badly damaged in an accident forcing Neal to switch to the new BMW 318 for the final race of the season.

He won the Total Cup for drivers without manufacturer support in 1993, before joining Mazda for a season cut short by a huge crash in round five at Silverstone. He rejoined Dynamics for 1995, remaining for several years and he occasionally humbled the big names, as well as winning the Independents' title three further times in 1995, 1999 and 2000. In 1999 he caused a sensation by winning a race at Donington Park in a Nissan Primera, the first Independent to do so in the modern era, winning him a £250,000 prize from BTCC series promoter Alan J. Gow. He took a further win a year later, having been considered a driver to cause a surprise in the championship. The championship's regulations changed for 2001, and Neal briefly joined Peugeot Sport UK before sitting out most of the season to race in the European Touring Car Championship.

British GT Championship (1998)
Neal drove a one-off appearance in the British GT Championship during the 1998 British Grand Prix-supporting race. He finished third, sharing a Porsche 911 GT1 with David Leslie.

European Touring Car Championship (2001)
After racing in one round of the British Touring Car Championship, Neal switched to the European Touring Car Championship's Super Touring category with RJN Motorsport and their Nissan Primera starting with Round 5 at Magny-Cours. He finished the championship placed 14th in the drivers standings on 266 points, taking one win in the final round in Portugal.

Return to the BTCC (2002–2003)
He returned with egg:sport in 2002 driving a Vauxhall Astra Coupé alongside Paul O'Neill. He finished 3rd in the championship, ahead of his teammate on 145 points.

A one-off appearance in the ASCAR championship at the end of 2002 saw him running as teammate to his future rival Jason Plato. For 2003 he switched to Honda Racing to drive a Honda Civic Type R, the start of long and mainly undisturbed relationship with Honda. Once again he finished 3rd in the championship ahead of teammates Tom Chilton and Alan Morrison.

Back to Team Dynamics (2004–2007)

Neal rejoined Team Dynamics (now with Halfords sponsorship), finishing 5th in the overall Drivers Championship and 4th in the Independents Championship.

For 2005 the team developed a Honda Integra from its basic road-going form, which was an unusual move as independent teams have historically raced ex-works cars, but the team's efforts were rewarded as Neal eventually took the drivers' title in the last round at Brands Hatch. Dynamics, as Team Halfords also clinched the Teams and Independent Teams Championships.  Neal finished every single race in the points, the first driver to do so since the calendar expanded to 30 races per year.

In 2006, Neal drove the No. 1 Honda Integra and captured the championship again with a string of consistent finishes; 4th place in round 28 being enough to clinch his second title. After 2 years without a mechanical failure, Neal had a suspension failure before the start of the final race.

BTC-spec cars such as the Integra were no longer eligible for the main 2007 title, so Dynamics switched to a Honda Civic, using some of their existing running gear but doing development themselves. Neal won the third race of the season, but overall the SEAT and Vauxhall entries were faster, leaving Neal unable to fight for the title. A huge crash in race 1 of the second meeting at Brands Hatch left him briefly hospitalised; the lost points from this saw teammate Gordon Shedden outpoint him to finish 3rd overall, with Neal 4th. He attracted controversy during the season's final race, in which Fabrizio Giovanardi and Jason Plato fought for the drivers' title. Having signed on as a Vauxhall driver for 2008, Neal let Vauxhall drivers Giovanardi and Tom Chilton through without a fight, but did not do the same for SEAT driver Jason Plato, ensuring Giovanardi would win the title.

VX Racing (2008–2009)
In his first year for VX Racing in 2008, he took just one win at Rockingham, while teammate Giovanardi took five wins on the way to retaining his title. Neal finished the year 5th in the standings. After a strong start to 2009, winning the opening race at Brands Hatch, he failed to win again all season, finishing fourth in the standings behind Giovanardi.

Honda Racing (2010–2020)

Neal returned to Team Dynamics for the 2010 season, now racing under the Honda Racing banner alongside former teammate Gordon Shedden. Neal lost out in the drivers championship to Jason Plato late in the season but he helped Honda Racing take the Manufacturers and Teams Championships.

Neal stayed with Honda in 2011, with the Honda Civic now using a 2.0 NGTC Honda engine built by Neil Brown Engines. For much of the season the Civics had an advantage over the rest of the field and after a closely fought title battle with his teammate, Neal took his third drivers' title – after 2005 and 2006 – for the Honda Racing team at the final round at Silverstone, this helping his team to secure the Manufacturers and Constructors title.

In 2012, Neal drove the new NGTC Honda Civic. He took the first ever win for an NGTC car in the British Touring Car Championship in the second race of the season at Brands Hatch. Neal won two more races at Oulton Park and with teammate Shedden taking the other win, Honda Yuasa Racing Team became the first team to win all three races in a day since Team Aon won all three races at Silverstone in 2010. He finished the season second in the championship behind teammate Shedden.

Neal stayed with Honda for the 2013 season alongside Shedden. Prior to the Silverstone round Neal broke his finger in a martial arts accident but was passed fitted to race by a doctor He underwent surgery before the season finale at Brands Hatch, Alain Menu tested for the team as a possible substitute for Neal in the event he was unable to race. Neal finished the year 4th in the championship, two places behind teammate Shedden.

He was again paired with Shedden for the 2014 season, this time driving the new Honda Civic Tourer. Neal was placed 9th in the overall standings.

For the 2021 season, Neal made no appearances on the BTCC grid for the first time since his debut in 1991, after Team Dynamics lost backing from Honda and GS Yuasa and obtained sponsorship from Cataclean: as a result the team fielded Shedden and Cataclean-backed driver Daniel Rowbottom as their 2021 line-up. According to Neal the team secured a sponsor to field a third car for him, however this was scuppered when other teams objected to the plan. He described the enforced break in his BTCC career as "not a retirement".

Australia
Neal has competed at the Bathurst 1000 on four occasions; in 1997 and 1998 with Steven Richards in a Team Dynamics Nissan Primera, in 2000 in a Paul Morris Motorsport Holden Commodore VT with Paul Morris and in 2008 in a Paul Morris Motorsport Holden Commodore VE with Boris Said. He also drove with Morris at the 2001 Queensland 500.

Other activities
Neal lives in Shenstone, Worcestershire.

He has appeared on Top Gear multiple times. He first raced in the Historic People Carrier race in Series 5. He participated in a football match using Toyota Aygos in Series 6 driving for James May's team. He raced a Mitsubishi L300 motorhome in the tenth series during a motorhome race. Neal appeared once again in Series 12's Bus Race, driving an Optare MetroRider. He then appeared in Series 14's airport vehicles race. In Series 20, episode 2 he drove a Mercedes-Benz E-Class in a taxi race. Elsewhere Neal has worked alongside Martin Haven as a co-commentator on Eurosport's coverage of the former World Touring Car Championship since 2010 and currently the World Touring Car Cup.

In May 2009 he gave both the Beijing gold medallist and 2008 World Cycling Champion, Ed Clancy and double World Cycling Champion, Rob Hayles, masterclasses around Oulton Park in a Vauxhall Astra 888 road car, prepared by Triple Eight Engineering – the team behind VX Racing.

In March 2015 he drove for Milltek Sport in their diesel Golf in the Mugello 12hr race finishing second in class, a week later driving a 500Hp 1979 Bastos Chevrolet Camaro with David Clark he won the Gerry Marshall Trophy race at the Goodwood Members Meeting.

During his 2021 sabbatical, Neal linked up with Jason Plato for a live recording of a BTCC-themed podcast.

Fitness
Matt Neal has stated that he keeps fit through training in martial arts, which gives him better aerobic fitness and flexibility. In 2012 Matt achieved the grade of 2nd dan black belt in the British Free Fighting Academy, after training with martial arts instructor Andy Hopwood.

Racing record

Complete British Touring Car Championship results
(key) Races in bold indicate pole position (1 point awarded – 1996–2002 all races, 2003–present just in first race, 2000–2003 in class) Races in italics indicate fastest lap (1 point awarded – 2001–present all races, 2000–2003 in class) * signifies that driver lead race for at least one lap (1 point awarded – 1998–2002 just in feature races, 2003–present all races)

Complete Deutsche Tourenwagen Meisterschaft results
(key) (Races in bold indicate pole position) (Races in italics indicate fastest lap)

† Not classified in championship due to only entering in the non-championship event.

Complete V8 Supercar Championship results

Complete European Touring Car Championship results
(key) (Races in bold indicate pole position) (Races in italics indicate fastest lap)

Complete Bathurst 1000 results

* Super Touring race

References

External links

Neal's Official Website
Profile from btcc.net

1966 births
Living people
Sportspeople from Stourbridge
People educated at Bromsgrove School
English racing drivers
British Touring Car Championship Champions
British Touring Car Championship drivers
Supercars Championship drivers
European Touring Car Championship drivers
ASCAR drivers
24H Series drivers
Mini Challenge UK drivers
Peugeot Sport drivers
Audi Sport drivers
Garry Rogers Motorsport drivers
Arena Motorsport drivers
Boutsen Ginion Racing drivers
TCR Europe Touring Car Series drivers